The Chepangic languages, Chepang and Bhujel, are Sino-Tibetan languages of uncertain affiliation spoken in Nepal. They are often classified as part of the Mahakiranti or Magaric families (van Driem 2001).

Until recently, the Chepang people were hunter-gatherers.

Classification
Schorer (2016:293) classifies Chepangic as part of his newly proposed Greater Magaric group.
Greater Magaric
Proto-Dura
Dura
Tandrange
Magaric: Kham, Magar
Chepangic-Raji
Chepangic: Chepang, Bhujel
Raji-Raute: Raji, Raute, Rawat

References

 George van Driem (2001) Languages of the Himalayas: An Ethnolinguistic Handbook of the Greater Himalayan Region. Brill.

Magaric languages
Languages of Nepal
Mahakiranti languages